The Top Prospect Tournament is an annual professional wrestling tournament held by Ring of Honor since 2011. The inaugural tournament took place in 2011 and has occurred every year since except for 2012 and 2018.

Format
Aspiring ROH wrestlers compete in a variety of "qualifying" singles matches with the winner(s) of each match advancing to the next round. There are three rounds, with the winner of the Top Prospect Tournament receiving a Ring of Honor contract and a shot at a Ring of Honor championship.

History
The tournament started in 2011 with the goal of giving rising wrestlers a chance of getting an ROH contract and displaying their talents for the promotion. In 2011, the first winner of the tournament was Mike Bennett, who went on to become an ROH mainstay. After a one-year break, the tournament returned in 2013 with the winner getting a chance at Adam Cole's ROH World Television Championship. The winner of the 2013 tournament was Matt Taven, who associated himself with Truth Martini and captured Cole's championship at the 11th Anniversary Show. He went on to become the longest reigning Television Champion in ROH history since the title's inception in 2010 before losing it to Tommaso Ciampa.

In 2014, Hanson won the tournament by defeating future tag team partner Raymond Rowe in the finals. In 2015, Donovan Dijak won a Ring of Honor contract after beating Will Ferrara. In 2016, Lio Rush defeated Brian Fury to win the tournament and instead gained an ROH World Championship opportunity against Jay Lethal. Rush lost the match and left ROH less than two years later. 

Dak Draper is the most recent winner of the Top Prospect Tournament, having won in 2019.

List of winners
2011 – Mike Bennett
2013 – Matt Taven
2014 – Hanson
2015 – Donovan Dijak
2016 – Lio Rush
2017 – Josh Woods
2019 - Dak Draper

Tournament history

2011
ROH's first Top Prospect Tournament took place in January 2011.

2013
ROH's second Top Prospect Tournament took place in January and February 2013.

2014
ROH's third Top Prospect Tournament took place in January and February 2014.

2015
ROH's fourth Top Prospect Tournament took place in January and February 2015.

2016
ROH's fifth Top Prospect Tournament was announced in December 2015 as happening January 9.

2017
ROH's sixth Top Prospect Tournament was announced in December 2016 as happening January 28.

2019
The seventh Top Prospect Tournament began on July 21, 2019 at the Mass Hysteria Event.
The announced competitors are Austin Gunn, Brian Johnson, Dante Caballero, Joe Keys, Dak Draper, Haitian Sensation, Ken Dixon and Makita.
The Semi-Finals were held during the joint ROH-CMLL show Global Wars Espectacular. Dak Draper defeated Austin Gunn at Death Before Dishonor event on September 29, 2019.

See also
ROH World Tag Team Championship
ROH Pure Championship

References

External links
rohwrestling.com (Official website)

Recurring events established in 2011
Top Prospect Tournament, ROH
Ring of Honor tournaments